Saw IV is a 2007 horror film directed by Darren Lynn Bousman from a screenplay by Patrick Melton and Marcus Dunstan, and a story by Melton, Dunstan, and Thomas Fenton. It is the fourth installment in the Saw film series and a sequel to 2006's Saw III. The film stars Tobin Bell, Scott Patterson, Costas Mandylor, Betsy Russell, and Lyriq Bent.

The film picks up where previous film left off, with the death of John Kramer. However, it is revealed that John had planned for his death and left behind a series of recordings and clues that would lead investigators to his final game. As the detectives try to unravel the mystery of John's final game, they are drawn into a web of deceit and deception that reveals the true motives behind his twisted games.

Saw IV was the first film in the franchise to not be written by Leigh Whannell or James Wan. It was released by Lionsgate Films in the United States on October 26, 2007, and received generally negative reviews from critics. Despite this, the film was a box office success, grossing $139 million worldwide. A sequel, titled Saw V, was released in 2008.

Plot
An autopsy of the Jigsaw Killer reveals a wax-coated microcassette in his stomach. The tape shows Detective Hoffman promising that "the games have just begun." In a mausoleum, Trevor and Art are chained to a large device. Trevor's eyes have been sewn shut, and Art's mouth has been sewn shut, making communication between them impossible. When the device begins pulling them together, they panic, and Art murders Trevor to retrieve a key from his collar.

Meanwhile, the police discover the corpse of Detective Kerry. After cautioning Officer Rigg for barging through an unsecured door, Hoffman is introduced to FBI Agents Strahm and Perez, who deduce that Amanda, Jigsaw's apprentice, would have needed assistance with Kerry's death, indicating that there is another apprentice.

That evening, Rigg and Hoffman are kidnapped. Rigg is told that Detective Matthews is in fact still alive, and is given ninety minutes to save him. He is then given his first test, where he finds Brenda is slowly being scalped. He rescues her, although he is warned not to, and Brenda later attempts to stab Rigg; Rigg subdues her and learns that Brenda was told that Rigg was there to arrest her for prostitution.

Rigg's next test is at a motel, where he is instructed to abduct the manager, Ivan, revealed to be a serial rapist. Angered by seeing videos of Ivan's exploits, Rigg forces Ivan into a prearranged trap, which dismembers him. Rigg's next test occurs in a school where Rigg attacked a man acquitted of abusing his family, though Rigg's career was saved by Hoffman. In one of the classrooms, Rigg discovers the husband and wife impaled on a pole, with the man dead and the woman clinging to life. Rigg tells the woman that she must remove the spikes herself before leaving, pulling a fire alarm as he does.

Strahm and Perez arrive on the scene, where it is learned that all of the victims were defended by Art, who is also the lawyer of Jill Tuck, Jigsaw's ex-wife. After a photographer is accidentally killed on the scene, Perez finds Billy, Jigsaw's puppet, in the office. She is told that Strahm will "soon take the life of an innocent man" and that her "next step is critical". Ignoring past clues that she is in danger, Perez continues with the investigation before Billy explodes; she is rushed to the hospital in critical condition. Furious, Strahm interrogates Jill, who recounts Jigsaw's backstory. She was once pregnant with a boy to be named Gideon, but suffered a miscarriage when Cecil robbed the clinic at which she was employed, and he slammed a door into her stomach. She and her husband grew apart and divorced. After learning that he had cancer and only a short while to live, Jigsaw placed Cecil in a trap which collapsed prematurely; Cecil then lunged at Jigsaw, but fell into a mesh of barbed wire. Strahm makes connections from Jill's story to the Gideon Meat Factory, the scene of Rigg's final test.

Strahm arrives but finds himself lost, accidentally trailing Jeff (from the previous film). Rigg, meanwhile, approaches his final test. In the next room are Art, Matthews, and Hoffman; it was revealed earlier that if the door was opened before Rigg's time was up, Matthews' head would be crushed between two ice blocks and Hoffman would be electrocuted by a complex device. Rigg charges through the door with one second to spare; despite Matthews' attempts to stop Rigg by shooting him, he is killed. Rigg shoots Art while, in another room, Strahm faces off with Jeff, who brandishes a gun, unaware that Jeff is frantically searching for his daughter. Strahm kills Jeff while Hoffman, who was never in any danger and is Jigsaw's other apprentice, rises and seals an injured Rigg and a bewildered Strahm in the factory.

Cast

Production

In January 2007, Saw writer James Wan stated that a script was under development.  Leigh Whannell told Fangoria that he and Wann would be executive producers stating,  "James [Wan] and I, as executive producers, are still treating it like our baby; we'll still oversee it. I've definitely been privy to the ideas they've had and the scripts they’ve been writing, and it’s coming along well. I'm actually excited".  That following month, Darren Lynn Bousman, who previously directed Saw II and Saw III, was announced to return as director. David Hackl, who served as production designer for the two previous Saw films, was offered to direct the film, but the day he received the offer his wife was diagnosed with cancer. Producers offered him directorial duties for Saw V and Saw VI. 

As Whannell was uninterested in writing any more Saw films, Twisted Pictures sought new writers and ideas for the fourth Saw film, making it the first film to not be written by him. An executive discovered Marcus Dunstan and Patrick Melton and read their script The Midnight Man. The executive thought that the duo's script could serve as a prequel to the first film, detailing a traumatic event in Jigsaw/John's early life. However, producers Mark Burg and Oren Koules did not want to do a prequel and dropped the idea, but the script led Dunstan and Melton to be hired to write the next three Saw films. Thomas Fenton also joined Dunstan and Melton as writer to the film.  Marek Posival was attached to write at one point. 

Stepping into the franchise was tricky for Dunstan and Melton given the serialized nature of the Saw films, but they counted with Bousman and the crew to watch over them, pitching a trilogy which would start with Saw IV and conclude in Saw VI. The duo did not have any trouble in bringing Jigsaw back into the story despite his death in the last film, as the character had been dying since the original film, feeling that the film would not feel like a Saw entry without the character on it.  Like in previous entries, rewrites took place during the writing process, leading many unused ideas for the film to later be recycled for Saw V.  

Even though Tobin Bell's Jigsaw Killer character was killed off in the previous entry, in March 2007 it was announced that he signed on for Saw IV and Saw V.

With a production budget of $10 million production budget, principal photography took place from April 16, 2007 to May 3, 2007 in Toronto.

Release
Saw IV was released theatrically in the United States and Canada on October 26, 2007. Lionsgate held its fourth annual "Give Til It Hurts" blood drive for the Red Cross.

Soundtrack
"Saw IV (Music From And Inspired By Saw IV)" was released on October 23, 2007, by Artists' Addiction Records. The film's theme song "I.V." was written by Yoshiki and performed by the rock group X Japan.

Home media
The DVD and Blu-ray was released on January 22, 2008 by Lionsgate Home Entertainment.

Reception

Box office
The film grossed $63,300,095 in the United States and Canada with an additional $76,052,538 in other markets, bringing the worldwide total to $139,352,633.

Critical reception
Saw IV received mostly negative reviews from critics. Review aggregator website Rotten Tomatoes reported an approval rating of 18% based on 83 reviews, with an average score of 3.9/10. The site's critics consensus reads "Saw IV is more disturbing than compelling, with material already seen in the prior installments". On Metacritic, the film has an average score of 36 out of 100, based on 16 reviews, indicating "generally unfavorable reviews". Audiences polled by CinemaScore gave the film an average grade of "B" on an A+ to F scale.

Scott Schueller, writing for the Chicago Tribune, called it "a film as edgy as a rubber knife” and said that "if the terrible craft of Bousman's film doesn't turn your stomach, the borderline pornographic violence will. It's disconcerting to imagine anyone enjoying the vile filth splashing the screen." Frank Scheck from The Hollywood Reporter said "the famously inventive torture sequences here seem depleted of imagination", but added that "it hasn't yet jumped the shark like such predecessors as the Nightmare on Elm Street and Friday the 13th movies eventually did." 

Peter Hartlaub from The San Francisco Chronicle called it "the Syriana of slasher films, so complicated and circuitous that your only hope of understanding everything is to eat lots of fish the night before and then watch each of the previous films, in order, right before you enter the theater." James Berardinelli wrote that "Saw IV functions as a drawn-out, tedious epilogue to a series that began with an energetic bang three years ago with Saw, then progressively lost momentum, coherence, and intelligence with each successive annual installment."

A less negative review came from Jamie Russell from the BBC, who called it "deeply unsettling; just like a horror movie should be."

References

External links

 
 
 
 
 

4
2007 films
Crime horror films
2007 horror films
2000s serial killer films
American sequel films
American splatter films
Canadian splatter films
Canadian sequel films
Canadian serial killer films
2000s English-language films
English-language Canadian films
Films scored by Charlie Clouser
Films directed by Darren Lynn Bousman
Films shot in Toronto
Lionsgate films
Torture in films
Film controversies in Romania
2000s American films
2000s Canadian films